Kuamaia is an extinct genus of artiopodan in the phylum Arthropoda. Fossils of the type species K. lata were discovered in the Chengjiang biota. The other species in the genus,K. muricata has also been identified there, but neither species has been found elsewhere.

Kuamaia lata was a benthic arthropod and a mobile hunter and scavenger. A spiny section on K. lata's legs is presumed to have allowed it to tear apart food.

Morphology 
Kuamaia lata has an oval dorsal exoskeleton shape, with a gradual decline from the somewhat elevated medial axis of the animal to the exoskeleton edge. K. lata appears smooth, with little space between tergites and low-profile pleural spines. Some fusion of parts of the exoskeleton is evident, but there is some discussion as to what degree this occurred. The tail segment has three more prominent spines, two being lateral and one axial. The largest fossil K. lata was at least 10 cm long, excluding appendages. 

On the underside of K. lata, opposite the dorsal head shield, there is also a ventral sclerite. K. lata appears to have approximately 15 pairs of biramous legs, 3 originating from the head shield, 1 from each of the seven tergites that make up K. lata's thorax, and another 5 from the tail segments. 

The ramuses, also known as the exopods of the biramous legs, acted as the gills of K. lata. These gills were made up of many lamellae, which facilitated gas exchange. These lamellae were packed together in rows on each exopod. K. lata had a lower number of these, with an average number of 22 lamellae per exopod, compared to an average of 50 in other arthropods.

References 

Artiopoda